Faruque Alam (born 1 March 1940) is a Bangladeshi Civil Engineer, Wood Technologist and former Chairman of Bangladesh Inland Water Transport Corporation (BIWTC). He was elected Member of Parliament from Shariatpur-3 constituency during 1986 Bangladeshi general election under Jatiya Party banner.

Early life
Alam was born on 1 March 1940 at Damudya Upazila in Shariatpur District of the then British Raj (now Bangladesh) to Sultan Alam Howlader and Noor Jahan Begum. He completed his early education from Dhaka and studied Wood Technology in Swedish-Pakistan Institute of Technology from 1959 to 1963. He was admitted to Erik Dahlbergs College of Engeeniering at Jonkoping, Sweden in 1966 and obtained his graduation in Civil Engineering in 1970.

Career
Alam started his career at Bangladesh Forest Industries Development Corporation in 1970 and served as General Manager until 1978. He was elected Member of Parliament from Shariatpur-3 constituency during 1986 Bangladeshi general election under Jatiya Party banner. He also served as the Chairman of BIWTC from 1991 to 1994.

References 

1940 births
Living people
People from Shariatpur District
3rd Jatiya Sangsad members
Jatiya Party politicians